Duke of Kent School is a 3–16 mixed private school in Ewhurst, Surrey, England.

The school was originally founded in 1920 at Vanbrugh Castle to provide education for the sons of Royal Air Force staff who had been killed in service. It moved to Ewhurst in 1976, was merged with Woolpit School, a boys' boarding school, renamed in honour of Prince Edward, Duke of Kent and began to admit girls. The Duke of Kent School also previously offered boarding.

The school building is a Listed building, built in 1885 and previously belonged to the Doulton family.

The boarding provision was last inspected by Ofsted in 2011, when the judgement was Good. The school itself is inspected by the Independent Schools Inspectorate. As of 2019, the most recent inspection was in 2017 and found that educational quality was excellent.

References

External links 
 
 The Debt We Owe - history of RAF schools

Preparatory schools in Surrey
Secondary schools in Surrey
Private schools in Surrey
Military schools
20th-century history of the Royal Air Force
Educational institutions established in 1920
1920 establishments in England
Grade II listed buildings in Surrey